The Treaty of Washington may refer to:
 Treaty of Washington (1805), between the U.S. and the Creek National Council (Muscogee (Creek))
 Treaty of Washington (1824), two Indian nation treaties, between the U.S. and the Sac (Sauk) and  Meskwaki (Fox) (7 Stat. 229), and the Iowa (7 Stat. 231) 
 Treaty of Washington (1826), between the U.S. and the Creek National Council led by Opothleyahola
 Treaty of Washington, with Menominee (1831), between the U.S. and the Menominee Indian tribe
 Treaty of Washington (1836), a U.S.–Native American (Ottawa and Chippewa) treaty
 Webster–Ashburton Treaty of 1842. It settled the border dispute between Canada and the Eastern States, such as Maine and Vermont. It helped to end the slave trade
 The Oregon Treaty of 1846, which established the US–British frontier west of the Rocky Mountains (today's US–Canada boundary)
 Treaty of Washington (1855), between the U.S. and Ojibwa
 The Treaty of Washington (1871), a general agreement between the United States and the British Empire
 The International Meridian Conference of 1884 in Washington DC, establishing the Greenwich Meridian, the world time zone system and the universal day as international standards
 The Treaty of Washington (1900) between Spain and the United States
 The Washington Naval Treaty of 1922 that limited naval armaments
 The North Atlantic Treaty of 1949 that created NATO
 The Treaty of Washington (1989), Treaty on Intellectual Property in respect of integrated circuits
 The Convention on International Trade in Endangered Species of Wild Fauna and Flora, better known as CITES